Robert Edward Crable (born September 22, 1959) is an American former college and professional football player who was a linebacker in the National Football League (NFL) for six seasons during the 1980s.  He played college football for the University of Notre Dame, and twice earned consensus All-American honors.  A first-round pick in the 1982 NFL Draft, he played professionally for the NFL's New York Jets.

Early years

Crable was born in Cincinnati, Ohio, and grew up in nearby Deer Park, a Cincinnati suburb.  He attended Archbishop Moeller High School, and compiled an accomplished high school football career.  His Moeller high school teams won three consecutive football state championships and compiled a three-season record of 36–0.

College career

He attended the University of Notre Dame and pursued a degree in business administration and marketing.  He played for coach Dan Devine and coach Gerry Faust's Notre Dame Fighting Irish football teams from 1978 to 1982, and he was selected as team captain his junior and senior seasons.  He was recognized as a consensus first-team All-American in both 1980 and 1981, while compiling the following statistical records: 521 career tackles—still a Notre Dame record; most tackles in a season (187 in 1979) and a game (26 vs. Clemson in 1979), and his 26 tackles also ties an NCAA single-game record.

Professional career

After graduating from Notre Dame, Crable was selected in the first round (23rd pick) of the 1982 NFL Draft by the New York Jets.  He played linebacker with the Jets for seven years.  After sustaining two knee injuries that ended his professional football career, he returned to Cincinnati.  He began his own business—Crable Sportswear—while playing for the Jets, until his top-of-the-line sportswear company was purchased by The Midland Company in 1989, and Crable retained the position of company president.

Life after the NFL

Crable then returned to his high school alma mater, Moeller High School, during the 1992–93 school year as a coach and part-time religion teacher.  The next year, he accepted a full-time teaching position in the religion department.  He became certified to teach religion by the Archdiocese of Cincinnati after attending The Athenaeum of Ohio.  He was named the head football coach of Moeller High School and coached for eight seasons from 2000 to 2007.
Crable now owns and operates Hilltop Management Company serving the greater Cincinnati area.   Crable, a two-time consensus All-American linebacker at Notre Dame, was named to the National Football Foundation's College Football Hall of Fame Class of 2017.

References

1959 births
Living people
All-American college football players
American football linebackers
The Athenaeum of Ohio alumni
Notre Dame Fighting Irish football players
New York Jets players
Players of American football from Cincinnati
People from Deer Park, Ohio